Didra Darleny Martínez Moreira (born 25 November 1999) is a Guatemalan footballer who plays as a defender for Deportivo Xela and the Guatemala women's national team.

References

1999 births
Living people
Women's association football defenders
Guatemalan women's footballers
People from Escuintla Department
Guatemala women's international footballers